Tuuli Takala (born 1987, Helsinki) is a Finnish classical singer and operatic soprano.

Early life 
Takala was born into a musical family in Helsinki, Finland in 1987. She began her musical education at age five with the violin, which remained her main instrument for almost 15 years. Since the age of six she has also sung in various choirs, including the renowned Tapiola Choir and the EMO Ensemble.

Takala studied at the Sibelius Academy in Helsinki, Finland. She was initially in the Programme of Music Education, studying voice under the guidance of soprano Aulikki Eerola. Then, she broadened her singing education with soprano Ritva-Liisa Korhonen at the Helsinki Metropolia University of Applied Sciences and at the Sibelius Academy Opera Programme, from which she holds a Master of Music degree.

Career 
Tuuli Takala became known to the broad audience after she won two renowned national singing competitions in the summer of 2013: the Timo Mustakallio Competition and the Kangasniemi Singing Competition, followed by her triumphant professional debut at the Finnish National Opera in the role of the Queen of the Night in Mozart’s Magic Flute. Tuuli’s international stage debut followed two years later in 2015 when she joined the Semperoper Dresden in their new production of W.A. Mozart’s opera The Marriage of Figaro. In the same year she was also a finalist and recipient of 2 Engagement Prizes at the 34th International Hans Gabor Belvedere Singing Competition in Amsterdam.

Thereafter Takala has performed at many of Europe’s leading opera houses, including the Royal Opera House London (Covent Garden), Staatsoper Berlin, the Bolshoi Theatre of Moscow, Deutsche Oper Berlin, Hamburg State Opera, Volksoper Wien and Komische Oper Berlin. Since season 2015/16 Tuuli Takala is also a permanent member of the ensemble at Semperoper Dresden, Germany.

Takala’s most notable roles include the Queen of the Night (The Magic Flute), Lucia di Lammermoor, Gilda (Rigoletto), Violetta Valéry (La Traviata), Sophie (Der Rosenkavalier), Marguerite (Gounod's Faust), Susanna (The Marriage of Figaro), Marzelline (Fidelio), La Contessa di Folleville (Il viaggio a Reims) and Olympia (The Tales of Hoffmann).

Tuuli has a long-lasting artistic collaboration with the Savonlinna Opera Festival. After singing in the festival chorus as a student (2011-2012), she has delighted audiences there in the roles of The Queen of the Night in The Magic Flute (2014), Barbarina in The Marriage of Figaro (2015 as part of the visiting ensemble of Semperoper Dresden), Zerlina in Don Giovanni (2016), Gilda in Verdi's Rigoletto (2017) and Marguerite in Gounod's Faust (2018). In 2019 she sang there as the soprano soloist in W.A. Mozart's Great Mass in c minor.

Prizes and awards 
 2013 – Arnold Schönberg Center special prize and finalist in the 8th International Hilde Zadek Singing Competition, Vienna, Austria
 2013 – Winner of the Timo Mustakallio Competition
 2013 – 1st prize in the Kangasniemi Singing Competition
 2013 – Sibelius Birth Place Medal (Sibelius Society of Hämeenlinna, Finland)
 2014 – Young Artist of the Year 2014 (Pro Musica Foundation, Finland)
 2015 – 2 special prizes and finalist at the 34th International Hans Gabor Belvedere Singing Competition, Amsterdam, Holland
 2018 – Named "Female Singer of the Year" (1st AINO Opera Gala, Finland)
 2018 – Recipient of the Curt Taucher Award (Semperoper Foundation, Dresden, Germany)

References

External links
 TuuliTakala.com
Tuuli Takala in Operabase.com

1987 births
Living people
Sibelius Academy alumni
Finnish operatic sopranos
21st-century Finnish women opera singers